The president of the Virginia Bar Association is the chief executive officer of the Virginia Bar Association (VBA), the Commonwealth's voluntary statewide bar association. The president is the Association's chief spokesman and presides at all meetings of its members. Every year, a slate of candidates are nominated by the organization's Board of Governors. At the annual full meeting of the Association's members, a president-elect is chosen by direct popular vote from among the nominees. At the adjournment of the succeeding year's annual meeting, the president-elect is then sworn in as president. In the event of an emergency such as the death or resignation of the president elected as above, the president-elect discharges the duties of the president. If the president-elect is not available to succeed the president, a temporary replacement is appointed by the Board of Governors, and, if necessary, both a new president and president-elect are elected at the next annual meeting.

After the VBA's foundation in July 1888, William J. Robertson of Charlottesville became its first president. The presidency has a term of only one year. From 1888 to 1975, the VBA annual meeting was held during the summer. From 1975 onwards, it has been held in January.

A total of 134 people have served as the president of the Virginia Bar Association since its formation. Victor O. Cardwell is the current president.

List of presidents

References

External links
Virginia Bar Association

1888 establishments in Virginia